This is a shortened version of the third chapter of the ICD-9: Endocrine, Nutritional and Metabolic Diseases, and Immunity Disorders. It covers ICD codes 240 to 279. The full chapter can be found on pages 145 to 165 of Volume 1, which contains all (sub)categories of the ICD-9. Volume 2 is an alphabetical index of Volume 1. Both volumes can be downloaded for free from the website of the World Health Organization.

Disorders of thyroid gland (240–246)
  Simple and unspecified goiter
  Goiter, unspec.
  Nontoxic nodular goiter
  Thyroid nodule
  Goiter, unspec. nontoxic nodular
  Thyrotoxicosis with or without goiter
  Goiter toxic, diffuse
  Hyperthyroidism, NOS
  Congenital hypothyroidism
  Acquired hypothyroidism
  Hypothyroidism, post-surgical
  Hypothyroidism, post-ablative
  Hypothyroidism, unspec.
  Thyroiditis
  Thyroiditis, acute
  Thyroiditis, subacute
  Thyroiditis, chronic, Hashimoto's
  Other disorders of thyroid
  Thyroid cyst

Diseases of other endocrine glands (249–259)
 Note: for 249–259, the following fifth digit can be added:
 (250.x0) Diabetes mellitus type 2
 (250.x1) Diabetes mellitus type 1
 (250.x2) Diabetes mellitus type 2, uncontrolled
 (250.x3) Diabetes mellitus type 1, uncontrolled
  Secondary diabetes mellitus
  Secondary diabetes mellitus without mention of complication
  Secondary diabetes mellitus with ketoacidosis
  Secondary diabetes mellitus with hyperosmolarity
  Secondary diabetes mellitus with other coma
  Secondary diabetes mellitus with renal manifestations
  Secondary diabetes mellitus with ophthalmic manifestations
  Secondary diabetes mellitus with neurological manifestations
  Secondary diabetes mellitus with peripheral circulatory disorders
  Secondary diabetes mellitus with other specified manifestations
  Secondary diabetes mellitus with unspecified complications
  Diabetes mellitus
  Diabetes mellitus without mention of complication
  Diabetes with ketoacidosis
  Diabetes with hyperosmolarity
  Diabetes with other coma
  Diabetes with renal manifestations
  Diabetes with ophthalmic manifestations
  Diabetes with neurological manifestations
  Diabetes with peripheral circulatory disorders
  Diabetes with other specified manifestations
  Diabetes with unspecified complication
  Other disorders of pancreatic internal secretion
  Hypoglycemia, nondiabetic, unspec.
  Disorders of parathyroid gland
  Hyperparathyroidism, unspec.
  Hyperparathyroidism, primary
  Hypoparathyroidism
  Disorders of the pituitary gland and its hypothalamic control
  Growth hormone deficiency
  SIADH
  Diseases of thymus gland
  Disorders of adrenal glands
  Cushing's syndrome
  Ovarian dysfunction
  Ovarian failure, postablative
  Ovarian failure, other
  Ovaries, polycystic
  Testicular dysfunction
  Testicular hypofunction
  Polyglandular dysfunction and related disorders
  Other endocrine disorders
  Puberty, delayed
  Sexual precocity

Nutritional deficiencies (260–269)
  Kwashiorkor
  Nutritional marasmus
  Other severe protein–calorie malnutrition
  Other and unspecified protein–calorie malnutrition
  Vitamin A deficiency
  With conjunctival xerosis
  With conjunctival xerosis and Bitot's spot
  With corneal xerosis
  With corneal ulceration and xerosis
  With keratomalacia
  With night blindness
  With xerophthalmic scars of cornea
  Other ocular manifestations of vitamin A deficiency
  Other manifestations of vitamin A deficiency
  Unspecified vitamin A deficiency
  Thiamine and niacin deficiency states
  Beriberi
  Other and unspecified manifestations of thiamine deficiency
 Wernicke's encephalopathy
  Pellagra
  Deficiency of B-complex components
  Ariboflavinosis
  B12 deficiency w/o anemia
  Ascorbic acid deficiency
  Vitamin D deficiency
  Other nutritional deficiencies
  Deficiency of vitamin K
  Deficiency of other vitamins
  Unspecified vitamin deficiency
  Mineral deficiency, not elsewhere classified

Other metabolic and immunity disorders (270–279)

Disorders of amino-acid transport and metabolism
  Disorders of amino-acid transport and metabolism
  Disturbances of amino-acid transport
 Cystinosis
 Cystinuria
 Hartnup disease
  Phenylketonuria (PKU)
  Tetrahydrobiopterin deficiency
  Other disturbances of aromatic amino-acid metabolism
 Albinism
 Alkaptonuria
 Hypertyrosinemia
 Ochronosis
 Waardenburg syndrome
  Disturbances of branched-chain amino-acid metabolism
 Isobutyryl-coenzyme A dehydrogenase deficiency
 Isovaleric acidemia
 Maple syrup urine disease
 Methylmalonic acidemia
 Propionic acidemia
  Disturbances of sulphur-bearing amino-acid metabolism
 Homocystinuria
  Disorders of histidine metabolism
 Carnosinemia
 Histidinemia
 Hyperhistidinemia
 Imidazole aminoaciduria
 Urocanic aciduria
  Disorders of urea cycle metabolism
 Citrullinemia
 Hyperammonemia
  Disorders of straight-chain amino-acid metabolism
 Hyperlysinemia
 Pipecolic acidemia
 Saccharopinuria
  Other specified disorders of amino-acid metabolism
 Trimethylaminuria

Disorders of carbohydrate transport and metabolism
  Disorders of carbohydrate transport and metabolism
  Glycogenosis
 Von Gierke's disease
 McArdle's disease
 Pompe's disease
  Galactosemia
  Hereditary fructose intolerance
  Intestinal disaccharidase deficiencies and disaccharide malabsorption
 Lactose intolerance
 Glucose intolerance
  Renal glycosuria
  Other specified disorders of carbohydrate transport and metabolism
  Unspecified disorder of carbohydrate transport and metabolism

Disorders of lipoid metabolism
  Disorders of lipoid metabolism
  Pure hypercholesterolemia
 Fredrickson Type IIa hyperlipoproteinemia
 Familial hypercholesterolemia
  Pure hyperglyceridemia
 Hypertriglyceridemia, essential
 Fredrickson Type IV hyperlipoproteinemia
  Hyperlipidemia, mixed
 Fredrickson Type IIb or III hyperlipoproteinemia
 Tubo-eruptive xanthoma
 Xanthoma tuberosum
  Hyperchylomicronemia
 Bürger-Grütz syndrome
 Fredrickson type I or V hyperlipoproteinemia
 Hyperlipidemia, Group D
 Mixed hyperglyceridemia
  Other and unspecified hyperlipidemia
 Alpha-lipoproteinemia
 Combined hyperlipidemia
  Lipoprotein deficiencies
 Abetalipoproteinemia
 Bassen-Kornzweig syndrome
 High-density lipoid deficiency
 Hypoalphalipoproteinemia
 Hypobetalipoproteinemia (familial)
  Lipodystrophy
  Lipidoses
 Gaucher's disease
 Niemann-Pick disease
 Sea-blue histiocyte syndrome
  Other disorders of lipoid metabolism

Disorders of plasma protein metabolism
  Disorders of plasma protein metabolism
  Polyclonal hypergammaglobulinemia
  Monoclonal paraproteinemia
  Other paraproteinemias
  Macroglobulinemia
 Waldenström macroglobulinemia
  Other disorders of plasma protein metabolism
 Atransferrinemia

Gout
  Gout
  Gouty arthropathy

Disorders of mineral metabolism
  Disorders of mineral metabolism
  Disorders of iron metabolism
 Aceruloplasminemia
 Hemochromatosis
  Disorders of copper metabolism
 Wilson's disease
  Disorders of magnesium metabolism
 Hypermagnesemia
 Hypomagnesemia
  Disorders of phosphorus metabolism
 Familial hypophosphatemia
 Hypophosphatasia
  Disorders of calcium metabolism
  Hypocalcemia
  Hypercalcemia
  Pseudohypoparathyroidism

Disorders of fluid, electrolyte, and acid-base balance
  Disorders of fluid, electrolyte, and acid-base balance
  Hypernatremia
  Hyponatremia
  Acidosis
  Alkalosis
  Mixed acid-base balance disorder
  Dehydration
  Hypovolemia
  Hyperkalemia
  Hypokalemia

Other and unspecified disorders of metabolism
  Other and unspecified disorders of metabolism
  Cystic fibrosis
  Disorders of porphyrin metabolism
 Porphyria
 Acute intermittent porphyria
  Other disorders of purine and pyrimidine metabolism
 Lesch–Nyhan syndrome
 Purine nucleoside phosphorylase deficiency
 Xanthinuria
  Amyloidosis
 Familial Mediterranean fever
  Hyperbilirubinemia
 Crigler–Najjar syndrome
 Gilbert's syndrome
  Mucopolysaccharidosis
 Hunter syndrome
 Hurler syndrome
 Morquio–Brailsford disease
 Sanfilippo syndrome
  Other deficiencies of circulating enzymes
 Alpha 1-antitrypsin deficiency
 Biotinidase deficiency
 Hereditary angioedema
  Dysmetabolic syndrome X
 Metabolic syndrome
  Other specified disorders of metabolism
  Primary carnitine deficiency
  Carnitine deficiency due to inborn errors of metabolism
  Iatrogenic carnitine deficiency
  Other secondary carnitine deficiency
  Disorders of fatty acid oxidation metabolism
 Carnitine palmitoyltransferase I deficiency
 Carnitine palmitoyltransferase II deficiency
 Very long-chain acyl-coenzyme A dehydrogenase deficiency
 Long-chain 3-hydroxyacyl-coenzyme A dehydrogenase deficiency
 Medium-chain acyl-coenzyme A dehydrogenase deficiency
  Disorders of peroxisomal metabolism
 Zellweger syndrome
  Disorders of mitochondrial metabolism
 Kearns–Sayre syndrome
 Mitochondrial encephalopathy, lactic acidosis and stroke-like episodes (MELAS syndrome)
 Mitochondrial neurogastrointestinal encephalopathy syndrome (MNGIE)
 Myoclonus with epilepsy and with ragged red fibers (MERRF syndrome)
 Neuropathy, ataxia, and retinitis pigmentosa (NARP syndrome)
  Tumor lysis syndrome
  Other specified disorders of metabolism

Obesity and other hyperalimentation
  Obesity and other hyperalimentation
  Obesity, NOS
  Localized adiposity
  Hypervitaminosis A
  Hypercarotinemia
  Hypervitaminosis D

Disorders involving the immune mechanism
  Disorders involving the immune mechanism
  Deficiency of humoral immunity
  Hypogammaglobulinemia unspecified
  Selective IgA immunodeficiency
  Selective IgM immunodeficiency
  Other selective immunoglobulin deficiencies
  Congenital hypogammaglobulinemia
  Immunodeficiency with increased IgM
  Common variable immunodeficiency
  Other deficiency of humoral immunity
  Deficiency of cell-mediated immunity
  Immunodeficiency with predominant t-cell defect unspecified
  DiGeorge syndrome
  Wiskott–Aldrich syndrome
  Nezelof syndrome
  Other deficiency of cell-mediated immunity
  Combined immunity deficiency
 Severe combined immunodeficiency
  Unspecified immunity deficiency
  Autoimmune disease not elsewhere classified
  Graft-versus-host disease
  Other specified disorders involving the immune mechanism
  Unspecified disorder of immune mechanism

International Classification of Diseases